Vera Pavlovna Vinogradova Biek (23 February 1895 – 19 April 1982) was a Soviet composer and pianist. She performed and published her music under the name "Vera Vinogradova."

Vinogradova was born in Leningrad. She studied music at the Leningrad Conservatory under Alexander Glazunov, Leonid Nikolayev, and Maximilian Steinberg. Following her graduation, Vinogradova remained at the Leningrad Conservatory to teach. She married jazz musician Hermann Biek (later known as "Ben Berlin") and they had a son (Leopold) and a daughter (Nina).

Vinogradova presented piano recitals throughout Europe and America. She and her husband lived in Berlin for a while, but moved to Tallinn in 1933 when Germany adopted a number of anti-Jewish laws. There, she taught piano, composed, and became involved with the Russian Theater and Music Society.

In 1936, the family moved to England permanently. Vinogradova continued to give piano lessons and compose. Peter Brook and Peter Ustinov were among her students. Vinogradova insisted that all of her students perform.

Vinogradova's music was published by Augener & Co and Benno Balan (Berlin). Her compositions included:

Chamber 

String Quartet
Suite (violin and piano)

Orchestra 

Ballade (piano and chamber orchestra)
Piano Concerto

Piano 

Deux Danses, opus 21
Friends of Youth (with Hermann Biek)
Tableaux d'Enfants, opus 25
Toccatina, opus 29

References 

Soviet composers
Soviet pianists
Women classical pianists
Women classical composers
1895 births
1982 deaths